James, Jim, or Jimmy Allen may refer to:

Military 
 James Allen (Army engineer) (1806–1846), organizer of the Mormon Battalion, helped found Des Moines, Iowa, and helped design the Chicago harbor
 James Allen (Medal of Honor) (1843–1913), Medal of Honor recipient during the American Civil War
 James R. Allen (1925–1992), former superintendent, U.S. Air Force Academy

Politics 
 James Allen (New Zealand politician) (1855–1942), cabinet minister
 James Allen (Virginia politician) (1802–1854), member of the Virginia House of Delegates
 James Allen (Alabama politician) (1912–1978), U.S. Senator from Alabama
 James C. Allen (1822–1912), U.S. representative from Illinois
 James E. Allen Jr. (1911–1971), commissioner of education for New York State
 Jim Allen (Wyoming politician) (born 1952), member of the Wyoming House of Representatives
 Jim L. Allen (1934–2003), member of the Kansas state legislature

Sports 
 James Allen (cricketer) (1881–1958), English cricketer
 James Allen (journalist) (born 1966), who has worked in, and commentated on, Formula One
 James Allen (linebacker) (born 1979), American football linebacker
 James Allen (running back) (born 1975), American football running back
 James Allen (racing driver) (born 1996), Australian racing driver
 Jim Allen (cricketer) (born 1951), Montserratian cricketer
 Jim Allen (footballer) (1912–1972), Australian rules footballer
 Jim Allen (hurdler) (born 1941), American track and field athlete
 Jimmy Allen (footballer, born 1909) (1909–1995), Portsmouth, Aston Villa and England footballer
 Jimmy Allen (footballer, born 1913) (1913–1979), Queens Park Rangers footballer
 Jimmy Allen (American football) (1952–2019), American football player
 Jimmy Allen (basketball), American college basketball coach

Writers 
 James Allen (newspaperman) (1806–1886), English-born writing in colonial Australia and New Zealand
 James Allen (author) (1864–1912), philosophical writer from England
 James Allen (collector), antique collector, co-author of Without Sanctuary: Lynching Photography in America
 James B. Allen (historian) (born 1927), historian of The Church of Jesus Christ of Latter-day Saints
 James Lane Allen (1849–1925), American writer
 James S. Allen (1906–1986), American Communist historian and journalist
 Jim Allen (4x4 writer) (born 1954), American 4WD magazine and book writer
 Jim Allen (Atlantis hypothesis), British author of hypothesis that the lost land of Atlantis is South America
 Jim Allen (playwright) (1926–1999), English playwright

Other 
 James Allen (educator) (1683–1746), English educationalist
 James Allen (d. 1829), female husband
 James Allen (highwayman) (1809–1837), Massachusetts criminal and memoirist
 James Allen (nurseryman) (1830–1906), British nurseryman
 James Allen (priest) (1802–1897), Anglican Dean of St David's, 1878–1895
 James Allen (Dean of Killaloe) (1805–1880), Anglican priest in Ireland
 James Baylis Allen (1803–1876), English line-engraver
 James C. Allen (engraver) (died 1833), English engraver
 James E. Allen (artist) (1894–1964), American illustrator, printmaker, and painter 
 James F. Allen (computer scientist) (born 1950), professor of computer science
 James F. Allen (businessman) (born 1960s), with Hard Rock International and Seminole Gaming
 James H. Allen (1928–2015), actor who played clown "Rusty Nails", inspired "Krusty the Clown"
 James L. Allen (1904–1992), co-founder of Booz Allen Hamilton; with PricewaterhouseCoopers
 James Latimer Allen (1907–1977), photographer and portraitist
 James Mountford Allen (1809–1883), British architect
 James Peter Allen (born 1945), Egyptologist
 James Van Allen (1914–2006), space scientist
 Jim Allen (archaeologist), Australian archaeologist
 Jim Allen (artist) (born 1922), New Zealand visual artist
 Jimmy Allen (musician), member of American rock band Puddle of Mudd
 Jimmy Allen (pastor), American Southern Baptist pastor
 Jimmie Allen, American country singer
 James Allen, cartoonist for Mark Trail
 James Allen, jewelry retailer owned by Signet Jewelers
 James Allen, protagonist in the 1932 film, I Am a Fugitive from a Chain Gang
 James Allen, a hidden antagonist in the 2023 film, Missing

See also
 James Allan (disambiguation)
 Allen (surname)